Türkmennebit (also spelled Turkmennebit, also known by the translation of the name as Turkmenoil (in English) or Turkmenneft (in Russian)) is the national oil company of Turkmenistan. It has its headquarters in Ashgabat.  The chairman of the company is Guychgeldi Baygeldiyev.
Main oil fields operated by Türkmennebit are Goturdepe, Barsa-gelmez, Nebitdag, Körpeje, Gamyşlyja, Çeleken and Kemer, mainly in Balkan Province near the Caspian Sea.

See also

Türkmengaz

References

Oil and gas companies of Turkmenistan
National oil and gas companies
Economy of Ashgabat